was a village located in Tone District, Gunma Prefecture, Japan.

As of 2003, the village had an estimated population of 5,025 and a density of 18.02 persons per km2. The total area was 278.90 km2.

On February 13, 2005, Tone, along with the village of Shirasawa (also from Tone District), was merged into the expanded city of Numata.

Dissolved municipalities of Gunma Prefecture